Suzhou District is a district of the city of Jiuquan, Gansu Province in the People's Republic of China. It was an important city in its own right. Today, as the seat of Jiuquan's administration, it is usually marked Jiuquan on maps. Ganzhou and Suzhou.

Name
Suzhou is named for the former Su Prefecture of imperial China.

History
Su Prefecture was established under the Sui and renamed Jiuquan Commandery under the Tang. Its seat was established just within the extreme northwest angle of the Great Wall near the Jade Gate. It sometimes served as the capital of the province of Gansu. Along with its role protecting trade along the Silk Road, Suzhou was the great center of the rhubarb trade. The old town was completely destroyed in the First Dungan Revolt but was recovered by the Qing in 1873 and was swiftly rebuilt.

Administrative divisions
Suzhou District is divided to 7 Subdistricts, 14 towns, 1 townships and 3 other.
Subdistricts

Towns

Townships
 Huangnipu Township()

Others
 State-owned Xiaheqing Farm()
 Jiuquan Economic and Technological Development Zone()
 Base 10

See also
 Other Suzhous
 List of administrative divisions of Gansu
 Jiuquan, for more history details.

Notes

External links
 

County-level divisions of Gansu
Jiuquan